This Time the Dream's on Me is a solo album by pianist Larry Willis which was recorded in 2011 and released on the Highnote label early the following year.

Reception

Allmusic's Ken Dryden reviewed the album stating "Larry Willis mixes standards, jazz classics, and potent originals on this solo piano release. The sessions have a late-night, ruminative flavor ... Recorded over two days on a top-notch Fazioli grand piano, this solo piano CD is easily among Larry Willis' best recordings".

Track listing 
All compositions by Larry Willis except where noted
 "This Time the Dream's on Me" (Harold Arlen, Johnny Mercer) – 5:49
 "Sanctuary" – 7:27
 "True Love" (Cole Porter) – 6:17
 "Lazy Afternoon" (Jerome Moross, John La Touche) – 7:21
 "A Single Petal of a Rose" (Duke Ellington, Billy Strayhorn) – 4:47
 "Blues for Marco" – 5:27
 "It Could Happen to You" (Jimmy Van Heusen, Johnny Burke) – 7:07
 "Lotus Blossom" (Strayhorn) – 3:11
 "Silly Blues" – 5:14
 "My Ship" (Kurt Weill, Ira Gershwin) – 8:58

Personnel 
Larry Willis – piano

References 

Larry Willis albums
2012 albums
HighNote Records albums